Sharyn Ghidella is an Australian journalist and news presenter.

Ghidella currently presents Seven News Brisbane with Max Futcher from Monday to Friday.

Career
Ghidella's career in television began in the region, as a reporter and presenter for North Queensland Television (now 10 QLD). She also produced and presented the regional weekly current affairs program, Newsweek. She moved to Brisbane to work with Network Ten's News division, before going to the Nine Network.

Nine Network 
She spent her first three years at the Nine Network reporting for National Nine News, writing and presenting hourly news breaks. In the mid-1990s she began hosting Nine's Daybreak program, which was later renamed National Nine Early News. She took over from Peter Overton as anchor of National Nine Morning News in 2000, but later switched with Mark Ferguson who had taken over at 6 am.

Returning to the early news meant she became a regular substitute host on Today filling in for anchor Tracy Grimshaw or news presenter Ian Ross. When Ross left the show in 2001, she became permanent news presenter, and continued as fill in host for the show.

In February 2005, Leila McKinnon replaced Ghidella on Today. Ghidella moved to co-host National Nine Early News alongside Chris Smith and weather presenter Majella Wiemers; this lasted until June 2005. Ghidella then moved back to her previous position as news presenter on Today while McKinnon moved to host National Nine Morning News.

Ghidella left Today and the Nine Network on 1 December 2006 with sources claiming she was upset by constantly being overlooked for other roles at National Nine News. Ghidella was replaced by National Nine Morning News presenter Georgie Gardner.

Seven Network 
In 2007, she replaced Tracey Challenor on Seven News Brisbane as weekend presenter. In 2008, she replaced Talitha Cummins on Weekend Sunrise as news presenter, and remained in the position until late 2010.

In January 2013, Ghidella began presenting Seven News Brisbane from Sunday to Thursday with Bill McDonald (and later Max Futcher) and was also appointed presenter of Today Tonight Queensland. The show was axed in February 2014.

She has hosted events for Qantas, The Australian Grand Prix Corporation, The Sydney Harbour Foreshore Authority, The Special Events Society, Shiseido, The Cairns Business Women's Association, The Cairns Amateurs, The Benevolent Society and ItalCommercio.

She regularly works with Meals on Wheels and is an ambassador for the Variety Clubs of Australia. She is also a supporter of the Humpty Dumpty Foundation and has lent a hand to the Prince of Wales Medical Research Institute and the Hope for the Children Foundation.

Personal life
Ghidella was born in Babinda, in Far North Queensland.

She and her partner, freelance cameraman Paul Croll, have two sons.

References

Australian television journalists
Living people
Seven News presenters
Year of birth missing (living people)